Trepobates subnitidus is a species of water strider in the family Gerridae. It is found in North America.

References

External links

 

Trepobatinae
Articles created by Qbugbot
Insects described in 1926